The 1968 Currie Cup was the 30th edition of the Currie Cup, the premier annual domestic rugby union competition in South Africa. It was also the first season that the Currie Cup became an annual competition, having previously been held intermittently.

Fixtures and Results

Final

See also

 Currie Cup

References

1968
1968 in South African rugby union
1968 rugby union tournaments for clubs